Verna: USO Girl is a 1978 American made-for-television biographical musical-drama film produced by Thirteen/WNET New York and broadcast nationwide by PBS as part of the Great Performances series on January 25, 1978.

Based on a Paul Gallico story, it focuses on untalented singer-dancer Verna Vain, who fervently believes that a U.S.O. tour overseas will put her on the road to superstardom. Although she's more willing than able, her brave self-confidence wins the hearts of the beleaguered GI audiences. They embrace the dauntless Verna because she, like them, is risking her life for the sake of the American dream.

Verna's fellow troupe members include Eddie, a second-rate vaudevillian, and would-be chanteuse Maureen, who encourages Verna (of whom she observes, "She's invented a new way to sing flat and dance clumsy") to set aside her show business fantasies and accept a proposal of marriage offered by Army engineering captain Walter.

Filmed in military training areas in Hammelburg and Baumholder, Germany by director Ronald F. Maxwell, it stars Sissy Spacek, William Hurt, Howard Da Silva, and Sally Kellerman. Period songs featured in routines created by burlesque comic Joey Faye and choreographed by Donald Saddler include "I'll Get By," "Jeepers, Creepers," and "Since You Went Away." Musical arrangements and Musical Direction by Joseph Turrin.

Da Silva won the Emmy Award for Outstanding Performance by a Supporting Actor in a Comedy or Drama Special, and Maxwell's direction and Innuarto's script received nominations.

"Verna's troupe is the kind of company that gives the small screen the illusion of depth. Engagingly told by talented people it can stand as a model for what made-for-TV movies could and should be." 
Frank Rich, Time Magazine, Jan 30, 1978

References

External links
 

1978 television films
1978 films
1970s biographical drama films
1970s musical drama films
American television films
American biographical drama films
American musical drama films
Television series by WNET
PBS original programming
1970s English-language films
Films directed by Ronald F. Maxwell
1978 drama films
1970s American films